Fyodor Ignatyevich Khaskhachikh (21 March 1907 – 5 November 1942) was a Soviet philosopher and dean of philosophy at the Moscow Institute of Philosophy, Literature, and History from 1939 to 1941. He worked on the history of epistemology and problems of epistemology within the framework of dialectical materialism.

A candidate of sciences, Khaskhachikh was working on a dissertation for the degree of doctor of sciences when he left the world of academia to volunteer for the Red Army after the German invasion of the Soviet Union in 1941. He died in World War II as a member of the Red Army's Kalinin Front in 1942.

Selected works
 Khaskhachikh, F. I. O poznovayemosti mira (On the Knowability of the World). Moscow: 1946.
German translation: Über die Erkennbarkeit der Welt. Berlin: Dietz Verlag, 1949.

External links
 Fyodor Khaskhachikh in the Soviet Philosopher's Encyclopedia 

1907 births
1942 deaths
Marxist theorists
Soviet military personnel killed in World War II
Soviet philosophers